Suresnes is a commune in the western suburbs of Paris, Île-de-France. Located in Hauts-de-Seine,  from the centre of Paris, it had a population of 49,145 as of 2016. The nearest communes are Nanterre, Puteaux, Rueil-Malmaison, Saint-Cloud and Boulogne-Billancourt. It is served by two stops on Île-de-France tramway Line 2 and Suresnes–Mont-Valérien station on the Transilien network, both giving access to La Défense and its RER A and Paris Métro Line 1 services. Suresnes's landmarks include the Mémorial de la France combattante and Suresnes American Cemetery and Memorial below Fort Mont-Valérien, as well as Foch Hospital in the town centre.

History
Fort Mont-Valérien (along with its Mémorial de la France combattante) is situated in the commune, as is Suresnes American Cemetery and Memorial. Suresnes has an elegant view of Paris and the Eiffel Tower, as does neighbouring Saint-Cloud.

Robert Ormond Maugham, the father of W. Somerset Maugham, built a “country house” in Suresnes around 1883. The house, which still exists at 5 Rue Worth, was described by R.O. Maugham’s grandson, Robin Maugham, as being, “very odd indeed – half Swiss chalet and half Japanese, with a projecting roof, stucco walls, and wooden supports for the little balconies.”

In 1974 the Spanish Socialist Workers Party held its 26th Congress in Suresnes (it was illegal in Spain under Franco). Felipe González was elected Secretary General, replacing Rodolfo Llopis Ferrándiz. González was from the "reform" wing of the party, and his victory signaled a defeat for the historic and veteran wing of the Party. The direction of the party shifted from the exiles to the young people in Spain who had not fought in the Spanish Civil War.

Population

Transport
Suresnes is served by Suresnes–Mont-Valérien station on the Transilien La Défense and Transilien Paris – Saint-Lazare suburban rail lines. It is also served by Île-de-France tramway Line 2, which stops twice in the commune, at Belvédère and Suresnes Longchamp.

The Pont de Suresnes carries the Allée de Longchamp, one of the main traffic arteries, from the Bois de Boulogne over the Seine into the western suburbs of Paris.

People from Suresnes
See: :Category:People from Suresnes
The following people have been associated with Suresnes:
 Shapour Bakhtiar (1914-1991), 45th Prime Minister of Iran, fought in the French Resistance, lived in Suresnes.
 Karine Ferri (1982), French model and television presenter, born in Suresnes.
 Blanche Gardin (1977), French comedian and actress, born in Suresnes.
 Julie Gayet (1972), French actress and film producer, partner of former President François Hollande, born in Suresnes.
 Kenny Kadji (born 1988), Cameroonian basketball player in the Israeli Basketball Premier League
 Noor Inayat Khan (1914–1944) lived in Suresnes with her family in a large estate known as Fazal Manzil from 1920 to 1940 during which time she studied at the Sorbonne. Noor Inayat Khan later returned to France as an agent of the Special Operations Executive, spying for the Allied cause in occupied France. She was executed by the Germans and posthumously awarded the Croix de Guerre and George Cross.
 Luc Lang (1956), French writer, born in Suresnes.
 Virginie Lemoine (born 1961), French actress and comedian, born in Suresnes.
 Marguerite Naseau (1594–1633), French nun and the first member of Daughters of Charity
 Vincent Peillon (1960), French politician, born in Suresnes.
 Stéphane Plaza (1970), French television presenter and real estate agent, born in Suresnes.
 Jérôme Rivière (1964), French politician, born in Suresnes.
 Alexis Salatko (1959), French writer, born in Suresnes.
 Michaël Youn (1973), French comedian and singer, born in Suresnes.
 Nathalie Stutzmann (1965), French contralto and conductor, born in Suresnes.
 Irène Marie Jacob (1966),  French-Swiss actress, born in Suresnes.

Universities 
Technician degrees are available at the Lycée Paul-Langevin. Suresnes also hosts the headquarters of the Institut national supérieur de formation et de recherche pour l'éducation des jeunes handicapés et les enseignements adaptés (INS HEA), a public college in the fields of disability. A campus of Skema Business School is located in the city.

Twin towns – sister cities

Suresnes is twinned with:

 Colmenar Viejo, Spain
 Göttingen, Germany
 Hackney, England
 Hannoversch Münden, Germany
 Holon, Israel
 Kragujevac, Serbia
 Villach, Austria

See also
 Communes of the Hauts-de-Seine department
 Fort Mont-Valérien
 Garden City of Suresnes
 Suresnes American Cemetery and Memorial

References

External links

 (in French)
 Map and info
 Suresnes libraries

Communes of Hauts-de-Seine